Tantura (al-Tantura, lit. Near the village, lies ruins of the ancient Phoenician city of Dor.

The village stood on a low limestone hill overlooking the shoreline of two small bays. The water was supplied from a well in the eastern part of the village. The al-Bab gate was in the southeast of the village. The Roman ruins were on the coast to the north with the hill of Umm Rashid to the south. In 1945 it had a population of 1,490.

The village was targeted in the early stages of the 1948 Arab–Israeli War, with its houses looted and its Arab Palestinian inhabitants expelled and others massacred by the Palmach underground Alexandroni Brigade. The Tantura massacre was first documented by a Palestinian politician in 1951, decades before a 2022 Israeli documentary revealed testimony from several IDF veterans affirming that a massacre, involving somewhere between several to 200 Palestinian victims, had taken place at that time.

History
Many shipwrecks from several periods have been discovered in the waters off Dor.

Iron Age
Dor was the most southern settlement of the Phoenicians on the coast of Syria and a center for the manufacture of Tyrian purple, extracted from the murex snail found there in abundance. Dor is first mentioned in the Egyptian Story of Wenamun, as a port ruled by the Tjeker prince Beder, where Wenamun (a priest of Amun at Karnak) stopped on his way to Byblos and was robbed.

Hebrew Bible reference
According to the Book of Joshua, Dor was an ancient royal city of the Canaanites commanding the heights, whose king became an ally of Jabin of Hazor in the conflict with Joshua. Dor is also mentioned in the Book of Judges as a Canaanite city whose inhabitants were put to 'taskwork' when the area was allotted to the tribe of Manasseh. In the Book of Kings, Dor was said to be incorporated into David's Israelite kingdom. In the 10th century BCE, it became the capital of the Heights of Dor under Solomon, and was governed by his son-in-law, Ben-abinadab as one of Solomon's commissariat districts.

Hellenistic and Roman periods
Josephus Flavius in his Antiquities of the Jews (14:333) describes Dor as an unsatisfactory port where goods had to be transported by lighters from ships at sea. Dora was the city where Antiochus, ruler of the Hellenistic Seleucid Empire with the aid of Simon Maccabaeus, laid siege to the usurper Trypho. During Pompey's invasion of Judea, Dora was razed, along with all the coastal towns, only to be rebuilt under Gabinius's direction.

Dor was an important salt production site, as attested to by pools and channels dug along the coast.

By the mid-3rd century CE, the city had deteriorated to little more than a fishing village.

Byzantine period
The importance of Dor/Dora rose again from the 4th to the 7th century CE, becoming by the 5th century the center of a bishopric. Several bishops of Dora of that period are mentioned in Christian church records. The settlement migrated off the ancient tel to the area east of it, centering on the church complex, which served as a way-station for pilgrims traveling to the holy places. In 1950–52 a church was excavated by J. Leibowitz, in 1979–1983 by C. Dauphin, and 1994 by S. Gibson and Dauphin.

Underwater exploration of a Byzantine wreck salvaged a medium-size boat constructed with iron nails. Based on coins recovered from the site, the boat dates to c. 665 CE, a decade after the Muslim conquest. Artifacts include several objects testifying to the practice of light-fishing.

Early Islamic period
The village of Tantura, further south, was probably established after the church was abandoned in the Early Islamic period. 34 apparently Muslim graves, dating from the 8th to the 14th century, have been excavated from the area of the ruined Byzantine church.

Crusader period
In the Middle Ages, a small fort surrounded by a moat was built on the southwestern promontory of the tell, overlooking the entrance to the southern bay. Dor has been identified with the Crusader principality of Merle, although excavations at the site, known in Arabic as Khirbet el-Burj, indicate that the moat was dug later, in the 13th century. The fort was in the possession of the Knights Templar until 1187, when it was conquered by Sultan Saladin after the Battle of Hattin. The Templars retook it shortly afterwards, at the latest during the Third Crusade. In the autumn of 1191, Richard the Lionheart rested there with his army as he waited for the Acre fleet. Eventually, the fort was controlled by the Mamluks along with the Château Pèlerin by 1291 or earlier.

Later titular Catholic see of Dora
There are records of several 14th and 15th century Latin bishops of the see, which under the name Dora is still a titular see of the Catholic Church.

Ottoman period

Tantura rose in importance in the mid-18th century with the increased demand for cotton in Europe. Zahir al-Umar carried out a policy of expansion of trade, increasing the capacity of the port at Tantura, as well as those of Haifa and Acre.

Tantura was visited in 1738 by Richard Pococke, who called it "Tortura." He wrote that it was a small village with a port to the south for large boats.

In 1799 when Napoleon Bonaparte besieged Acre, he used the anchorage at Tantura as a supply depot. Napoleon camped at Tantura on May 21, 1799, and a garrison was stationed there for the remainder of the French campaign. Napoleon's officer Lambert, who had been sent to investigate the port, reported that it had a population of about 2,000, who seemed sympathetic to the French. After the failure of his campaign, his troops retreated to Tantura, where he hoped to evacuate by sea, but his navy failed to appear. To free up horses for carrying the wounded, he ordered heavy ordnance dumped in the bay. Artillery pieces, muskets and ammunition have been found in underwater surveys around Dor. It appeared as the village Tantourah on the map that Pierre Jacotin compiled during this campaign.

The British traveller James Silk Buckingham, who visited in 1816, described al-Tantura as a small village with a small port and a khan (caravanserai). Mary Rogers, sister of the British vice-consul in Haifa, reported that in 1855 there were 30–40 houses in the village, with cattle and goats as the chief source of income. 

In 1859, William McClure Thomson described Tantura/Dor in his travelogue:
'Tantura merits very little attention. It is a sad and sickly hamlet of wretched huts on a naked sea-beach, with a marshy flat between it and the base of the eastern hills. The sheikh's residence and the public menzûl for travellers are the only respectable houses, Dor never could have been a large city, for there are no remains. The artificial tell, with a fragment of the Kùsr standing like a column upon it, was probably the most ancient site. In front of the present village and five small islets, by the aid of which an artificial harbour could easily be constructed. The entrance to which would be by the inlet at the foot of the Kùsr; and should "Dor and her towns" ever rise again into wealth and importance such a harbour will assuredly be made'.

When Victor Guérin visited in 1870, he found the village to have twelve hundred inhabitants, and further noted that the village itself was built largely with materials taken from the ancient city of Dor.

In 1882, in the PEF's Survey of Western Palestine, Tantura was described as a village on the coast with a harbour located to the north, and a square, stone building used as a guest house for travellers (probably the khan referred to by Buckingham). The population was engaged in agriculture and conducted a small trade with Jaffa.

In 1884 Mordechai Bonstein, a Russian Jewish farmer pioneer from Rosh Pinna, moved to Tantura to farm a tract of land owned by Baron Edmond de Rothschild. Bonstein, his wife Haya, and their nine children were the only Jews in the village. The farm was successful and the family maintained good relations with their Arab neighbours.

A population list from about 1887 showed that Tanturah had about 770 inhabitants, all Muslim. A boys' elementary school was built in Tantura in 1889.

In 1891, Baron Rothschild financed the development of a bottle factory in Tantura, as he planned to use the fine sand on the shore to manufacture glass bottles for the fledgling wine industry in Zikhron Ya'akov. A building was constructed under the supervision of Meir Dizengoff, a French glass specialist was brought in, dozens of workers were hired, and three ships were purchased to transport raw material and bottles. But, he abandoned the factory in 1895 after a string of failures.

In 1898, German Emperor Wilhelm II visited the ruins of the crusader castle.

British Mandate period

According to the British Mandate's 1922 census of Palestine, al-Tantura had a population of 750 inhabitants; 749 Muslims and 1 Roman Catholic Christian, increasing in the 1931 census to 953; 944 Muslims, 8 Christians and 1 Jew. During this period Tantura's houses, situated along the beach, were constructed from stone. In addition to the boys' school, a girls' school was founded in 1937-38. There were two Islamic holy sites in the village, including a maqam (shrine) dedicated to an Abd ar-Rahman Sa'd ad-Din.

During the British Mandate, the fish catch increased from six tons in 1928 to 1,622 tons in 1944. The major agricultural products were grain, vegetables, and fruit. In 1944/45 a total of 26 dunams was devoted to citrus and bananas, 6,593 to cereals and 287 dunams to orchards, mainly olives.

In Sami Hadawi's land and population survey in 1945, the town had a population 1,490; 20 Christians and 1,470 Muslims, and a total land area of 14,250 dunams. Of this, Arabs used 26 dunums for citrus and bananas, 6,593 to cereals; 287 dunums were irrigated or used for orchards, while a total of 123 dunams were built-up (urban) land.

1948 war
In 1948, al-Tantura was within the area designated by the United Nations in the Partition Plan for the Jewish State.  Some of the inhabitants were civil servants, working as policemen, customs officials and clerks at the Haifa Magistrates court. A paved road led to the Haifa Highway. The village was one of the most developed in the region. Some residents of Tantura had been involved in the armed Arab Revolt against the British, and three were killed in a skirmish with the British near the village. At the beginning of the 1948 Palestine war, the wealthier families fled to Haifa. Approximately 1,200 remained in the village, continuing to tend their fields, orchards, and ply their trade as fishermen.

Tantura was part of an Arab enclave cutting off the road from Tel Aviv to Haifa. Following attacks by local Arab villages on Jewish traffic from Tel Aviv to Haifa, on May 9, 1948, the Haganah leadership decided to "expel or subdue" the villages of Kafr Saba, al-Tira, Qaqun, Qalansuwa and Tantura. On May 11, David Ben-Gurion advised the Haganah to "focus on its primary task", which according to the New Historian, Ilan Pappe, was the bi'ur (lit. cleansing) of Palestine. According to Tiroshi Eitan (a local commander), the people of Tantura were ready to surrender in early May but not prepared to relinquish their arms.

Operation Namal
The British controlled the Haifa port area until April 23, 1948. The rest of the city fell to the Carmeli Brigade of the Haganah commanded by Moshe Carmel in Operation Misparayim (scissors). After the Haganah gained control of Haifa, Arab villages on the slopes of Mount Carmel began attacking Jewish traffic on the main road to Haifa. The Alexandroni Brigade was tasked with reducing the Mount Carmel pocket of resistance.

Morale among Tantura's Arab residents was low after the fall of Haifa. In early May, the population was reportedly ready to surrender if attacked or given an ultimatum, but was not to give up their weapons, and some residents began fleeing after an incident in which a local man murdered a Jew and was in turn killed. Many villagers fled to Tyre by boat. Perhaps heartened by the arrival of Arab forces in Israel/Palestine in mid-May, Tantura's villagers and those of surrounding towns decided to remain and fight. The inhabitants subsequently began to prepare defensive fortifications and lay mines. On the night of May 22–23, the Alexandroni Brigade's 33rd battalion launched an attack, employing heavy machine gun fire, followed by an infantry attack from all landward sides with an Israeli naval vessel blocking any chance of escape to the sea. Although the villagers put up serious resistance, the village fell to the Brigade by 0800hrs on May 23. According to an unsigned Haganah report, dozens of villagers were killed and 500 were taken prisoner (300 adult males and 200 women and children).

Most of the villagers fled to the nearby town of Fureidis and territory protected by the Arab League in the Triangle region near to what was to become the Green Line. Women and children were taken to Fureidis, which had already surrendered. On May 31, 1948, Bechor Shitrit, Minister of Minority Affairs of the Provisional government of Israel, sought permission to expel them due to overcrowding, lack of sanitation, and the risk of information being passed to unconquered villages. Haganah intelligence also pressured Ben-Gurion to expel them as they were giving intelligence to nearby unconquered Arab villages and due to problems with sanitation and overcrowding. It is unknown whether Ben-Gurion replied or not, but on 18 June most of the Tantura women and children were expelled to Tulkarm. Some women and children, probably those with male relatives still in Israeli detention, were allowed to remain in Fureidis. A Ministry official, Ya'akov Epstein of Zikhron Ya'akov, who visited Tantura shortly after the operation, reported seeing bodies, but said nothing of a massacre. In 1998, Yahya Al Yahya published a book on Tantura recording the names of 52 dead. The occupation of the village was followed by looting. Some of the items recovered by the Haganah included 'one carpet, one gramophone ... one basket with cucumbers ... one goat'.
The male prisoners of war were held in the Zichron Ya'akov police station.

In 1964 the IDF released an official history of "The Alexandroni Brigade in the War of Independence" in which 11 pages were devoted to al-Tantura. There was no mention of any expulsion of villagers. In 2004, Alexandroni veterans acknowledged the forced expulsion as public discussion arose about some of the events of the war. Some descendants live on in the Tulkarm refugee camp and are denied permission to visit what remains of their village.

Nahsholim and Dor
After the war, the kibbutz of Nahsholim and the moshav of Dor were built on land on the outskirts of al-Tantura. Jewish settlers initially moved into the abandoned Arab houses in the village but left after building more suitable housing further down the coast. According to local legend, when bulldozers tried to knock down the local Maqam (shrine) of Sheikh al-Majrami, the blades of the bulldozers broke. Kibbutz Nahsholim was established by Polish and American immigrants just southeast of the ancient tell in June 1948 while moshav Dor was established by Jewish immigrants from Greece along the southernmost bay in 1949. Kibbutz Nahsholim grows bananas, avocado and cotton, and raises fish in ponds. A plastics factory manufactures irrigation equipment. It also operates a beach resort.

Marine archaeology
A 9th-century wreck known as Tantura B, most likely an Arab trading vessel, was discovered in shallow water off the Tantura coast. Excavations were conducted from 1994 to 1996 by the Institute for Nautical Archaeology (Texas A&M University) and the University of Haifa's Center for Maritime Studies under the direction of Shelley Waschsmann and Yaakov Kahanov. The Tantura B hull was found resting on top of another shipwreck dating to the Roman period. Excavations at Tel Dor in 1986 unearthed an intact purple dye manufacturing installation, based on dye extracted from murex marine snails.

Published accounts of the massacre

Israeli journalist Amir Gilat published an article regarding a massacre in Tantura in Ma'ariv which was mainly based on a master's thesis submitted to the University of Haifa by graduate student, Theodore Katz. In a paper on The Exodus of the Arabs from the Villages at the foot of Mount Carmel, Katz said Israeli forces killed 240 Arabs from Tantura during the 1947–1949 Palestine war in 1948. Katz did not use the word massacre, although other scholars were quick to use this term. The Alexandroni veterans protested, and Gilat wrote a follow-up piece including their denial that a massacre had occurred.

Katz originally received a grade of 97%, but the veterans of the Alexandroni Brigade sued Katz for libel, and the legal case drew into question the accuracy of the oral testimony upon which Katz's claims were based. After two days' cross-examination in court, Katz signed a statement saying:

"After checking and re-checking the evidence, it is clear to me now, beyond any doubt, that there is no basis whatsoever for the allegation that the Alexandroni Brigade, or any other fighting unit of the Jewish forces, committed killing of people in Tantura after the village surrendered."

Katz retracted his statement 12 hours later, asserting that he had agreed to sign the retraction "in a moment of weakness" under pressure of family members, because he had suffered a stroke a year earlier and his family were afraid the strain of the court hearings will cause a relapse. However, the court already registered his stated retraction, ruled against him and refused to re-open the deliberations.

Katz appealed to the Israeli Supreme Court, but it declined to intervene. He also tried to place paid ads in the Haaretz and Yediot Aharonot papers, declaring that he was taking back his retraction and reaffirming the conclusions of his paper - but the papers' lawyers advised that publishing such ads might make the papers themselves liable to a libel suit.

In the wake of this case, the University of Haifa suspended Katz's degree, inviting him to revise his thesis. The paper was sent out to five external examiners, a majority (3:2) of whom failed it. Katz was subsequently awarded a "non-research" MA.

Subsequent related developments
The historian Ilan Pappé supported Katz and his thesis, and has challenged the Israeli veterans to take him to court, claiming he has evidence that the massacre occurred. In a 2001 article in the Journal of Palestine Studies, Pappé defended the use of oral history with reference to the USA. He pointed out that that history was obtained by Katz, not only from Palestinian villagers, but also from Israeli soldiers. Pappé provided new evidence that had come to light after Katz had presented his thesis, in one case quoting (with reference to the IDF source file) "from a document from the Alexandroni Brigade to IDF headquarters in June notes: 'We have tended to the mass grave, and everything is in order'”, and in another, published testimonies by eyewitnesses who had been located in Syria. He also related the background to Katz's original signed repudiation of his thesis.

In 2004, Israeli historian Benny Morris extensively reviewed the Tantura controversy and recounted himself coming away "with a deep sense of unease". He suggested that, while it is unclear whether or not a massacre occurred, there was no doubt that war crimes were committed by the Jewish forces (Haganah) and that the village was forcibly cleansed of its Arab inhabitants. Morris believes that one village woman was raped, Alexandroni troops may have executed POWs and there may have been some looting, based on an army report that uses the Hebrew word khabala (sabotage).

Morris underlined the fact that in interviews conducted by himself and by the Ma'ariv reporter Amir Gilat, all refugees 
confirmed that a massacre had taken place, while all IDF veterans denied it. Regarding the latter, Morris describes what he calls “troubling hints”, such as a diary by an Alexandroni soldier, Tulik Makovsky, in which he wrote “… that our boys know the craft of murder quite well, especially boys whose relatives the Arabs had murdered... or those harmed by Hitler [they are the same fascists]. They took their private revenge, and avenged our comrades who had died at their hands, against the snipers”. Morris also noted that, given the political sensitivities at the time, the word khabala may have been used as a euphemism for a massacre.

Morris further pointed out issues with the scoring of the second version of Katz's thesis in that the two referees who gave anomalously low scores had been co-authors of an IDF book in which it was argued that ”… the Israeli Army had carried out only a ‘partial expulsion’ of the populations of the Arab towns of Lydda and Ramlah and dismissed the charge that the troops had massacred Lydda townspeople, some of them inside a mosque, on July 12, 1948”, whereas IDF records from the IDF archive show that a full-scale expulsion had been carried out and that Yiftah Brigade troops killed some 250 townspeople.

In 2004 a proposal was made to exhume bodies from a site between Nahsholim and Dor believed to be a mass grave, but this has not happened. In 2006, Katz's presentation of the facts was disputed again by the Israeli historian Yoav Gelber who was to play a key role in discrediting Katz's research.

In January 2022, Tantura, a documentary by Alon Schwarz, premiered at the Sundance Film Festival. The film included interviews with several Israeli veterans who confirmed that they had witnessed a massacre at Tantura after the village had surrendered. Those interviewed provided descriptions, with the number of victims who were shot dead ranging from “a few” to “several dozen” or “more than 200”. The latter estimate was provided by a resident of Zikhron Ya'akov, who stated that he had helped bury the victims. They confirmed that soldiers in the Alexandroni Brigade had murdered unarmed men after the battle had ended, and that the victims were indeed buried in a mass grave, now located under the Dor Beach parking lot near Nahsholim kibbutz.

See also
 Depopulated Palestinian locations in Israel
 List of massacres committed prior to the 1948 Arab-Israeli war
 Killings and massacres during the 1948 Palestine War
 List of villages depopulated during the Arab–Israeli conflict
 New Historians

References

Bibliography

 

 

 
 

 Polzer, M. 2008. "Toggles and Sails in the Ancient World: Rigging Elements Recovered from the Tantura B Shipwreck". IJNA 37: 225–52.

 (Samera Esmeir, 2007, pp. 229-250; in Sa'di and Abu-Lughod)

External links
Welcome To al-Tantura
al-Tantura, Zochrot
Survey of Western Palestine Map 7: IAA, Wikimedia commons
 Benny Morris on Katz controversy 
 Yoav Gelber, Palestine 1948  about Tantura events.
 Documents gathered by Dan Censor on Tantura Affairs  quoted in Yoav Gelber, Palestine 1948, 2006.
 Journal of Palestine Studies, Vol. 30, No. 3, (Spring 2001), pp. 5–18: Al Wali The Tantura Massacre
 Journal of Palestine Studies, Vol. 30, No. 3, (Spring 2001), pp. 19–39: The Tantura Case in Israel: The Katz Research and Trial by Ilan Pappe

District of Haifa
Arab villages depopulated prior to the 1948 Arab–Israeli War
Namal
Maritime archaeology in Israel
Haifa District
Dora